Fire Department Coffee is an American coffee retailer and coffee roaster based in Rockford, Illinois. It was founded by Luke Schneider in 2016.

History 
Fire Department Coffee was founded by Luke Schneider, a Navy veteran and former Rockford firefighter and paramedic. Schneider hired fellow firefighter Jason Patton as the company's vice president and made him a part-owner. The brand launched its first roasting center in a local strip mall in 2016.

In 2017, the company announced the Spirit Infused Coffee collection after developing it in 2016.

Professional mixed martial artist and former UFC champion Stipe Miocic starred in a commercial for Fire Department Coffee in 2020. The company released an “extra strength” coffee blend named after and endorsed by Miocic in 2020.

In January 2021, the company purchased the Al Grace Appliance building in Rockford to use as its international distribution center. Fire Department Coffee also purchased a building to use as its first café location in the 900 block of W. Riverside Blvd in 2022.

They launched a line of ready to drink coffees in October 2022.

Fire Department Coffee is certified as a veteran-owned business by the National Veteran-Owned Business Association. It is run by active and retired firefighters.

Fire Department Coffee also produces coffee infused with spirits such as rum, tequila, whisky, and bourbon. Its local and national distribution partners and resellers include Meijer, Albertsons, and Candy Cloud.

Fire Department Coffee Charitable Foundation 
Through its affiliated non-profit organization, the Fire Department Coffee Charitable Foundation, Fire Department Coffee donates a portion of proceeds to provide aid for sick and injured first responders.

References 

American companies established in 2016
Coffee brands
Coffeehouses and cafés in the United States